Makhdum Sharifi Shirazi was a Persian Sunni statesman and author, who served as the minister of religious affairs (sadr) during the reign of Ismail II (r. 1576–77), and ultimately took refuge in the Ottoman Empire, where he wrote the al-Nawaqez le-bonyān al-rawafez, a sizable anti-Shia argumentative book.

Sources 

 
 
 
 
 
 
 
 
 
 

16th-century Iranian politicians
1587 deaths
1540 births
Safavid civil servants
People from Shiraz
Safavid theologians
16th-century writers of Safavid Iran
Iranian emigrants to the Ottoman Empire
16th-century Iranian writers